Karol Sloboda (born 16 May 1983) is a Slovak professional ice hockey player. He is currently a free agent having last played for Bratislava Capitals of the bet-at-home ICE Hockey League.

Career
He had most recently played for HC Vítkovice Steel in the Czech Extraliga. He has formerly played with HC Slovan Bratislava in the Slovak Extraliga.

Career statistics

Regular season and playoffs

International

References

External links

1983 births
Living people
HC Karlovy Vary players
HC Kometa Brno players
HC Lada Togliatti players
Ottawa 67's players
HC Slavia Praha players
HC Slovan Bratislava players
HC Sparta Praha players
HC Vítkovice players
HK Dukla Trenčín players
HK 36 Skalica players
HC '05 Banská Bystrica players
Bratislava Capitals players
Slovak ice hockey defencemen
Ice hockey people from Bratislava
Slovak expatriate ice hockey players in Canada
Slovak expatriate ice hockey players in the Czech Republic
Slovak expatriate ice hockey players in Russia